Fosterella robertreadii is a plant species of the genus Fosterella. It is endemic to Peru.

References

robertreadii
Endemic flora of Peru
Plants described in 2009